Digras is a city and a municipal council in the Yavatmal district located in the state of Maharashtra, India. Digras is 638 km from state capital Mumbai  and 221 km from winter capital Nagpur.

Places of Interest 
Mallikarjun Temple 

Ghanti Baba Temple 

Bhavani Devi Temple

Ramananda Maharaj Math

Shani Mandir

Demographics 
 India census, Digras had a population of 154,122. Males constitute 52% of the population and females 48%.

Transportation 
Digras is connected to major cities in the Maharashtra State by road. MSRTC buses run from Digras to Mumbai, Nagpur, Yavatmal, Pune, Amravati, Akola, Hingoli, Nanded, Solapur, Aurangabad, Raipur, Umarkhed, Mahur, Adilabad, Mahagaon and Indore. Roads in Digras are not yet equipped with traffic signals.

References 

Cities and towns in Yavatmal district
Talukas in Maharashtra